The pale toadfish (Ambophthalmos angustus, previously classified as Neophrynichthys angustus) is a fathead sculpin of the family Psychrolutidae, found on the continental shelf around New Zealand, between 250 and 1,000 metres deep.  It is up to 30 cm long.

References

 
 Tony Ayling & Geoffrey Cox, Collins Guide to the Sea Fishes of New Zealand,  (William Collins Publishers Ltd, Auckland, New Zealand 1982) 

Pale toadfish
Endemic marine fish of New Zealand
Fish described in 1977